Muran Rural District is a rural district (dehestan) in Soveyseh District, Karun County, Khuzestan Province, Iran. At the 2006 census, its population was 9,391, in 1,845 families.  The rural district has 12 villages.  The rural district was established on 23 January 2013.

References 

Rural Districts of Khuzestan Province
Karun County
2013 establishments in Iran